Wayne Suttles (1918–2005) was an American anthropologist and linguist.

He was the leading authority on the ethnology and linguistics of the Coast Salish people of the Northwest Coast of North America.

Biography

As a student of Erna Gunther at the University of Washington, Suttles in 1951, was the first to be awarded a Ph.D. in anthropology at that institution. He did ethnographic work with Northwest Coast people, especially the Coast Salish, beginning in the mid-1940s and linguistic work beginning in the mid-1950s. His publications on the Coast Salish, including his interpretation of the relationship between culture and environment and the nature of the social network, have had a significant influence on both ethnographic and archaeological work in the region. As editor of Vol. 7, Northwest Coast, of the Handbook of North American Indians, Suttles was instrumental in making scholars active in different kinds of research aware of each other's work. He also testified as an expert witness in several legal cases relating to Native rights in both Washington State and British Columbia, the most important of which was R. v. Sparrow, which established Native fishing rights across Canada. His 2004 grammar of the Musqueam language was a milestone in Salish studies.

Selected works

(2004) Musqueam Reference Grammar. Vancouver: University of British Columbia Press.
(1998) The Ethnographic Significance of the Fort Langley Journals. pp. 163–210 in The Fort Langley Journals, 1827-1830, Edited by Morag Maclachlan. Vancouver: University of British Columbia Press.
(1987) Coast Salish Essays. Vancouver: Talonbooks; Seattle: University of Washington.
(1974) The Economic Life of the Coast Salish of Haro and Rosario Straits. New York: Garland.

1918 births
2005 deaths
University of Washington alumni
Linguists of Salishan languages
20th-century American anthropologists